Eagle Valley may refer to:

 Eagle Valley, British Columbia, Shuswap, around Sicamous.
 Eagle Valley (California), Riverside County
 Eagle Valley, Colorado, in  the Vail area
 Eagle Valley Township, Minnesota
 Eagle Valley (Nevada), in the Carson City area
 Eagle Valley Dam and Reservoir, Spring Valley State Park, Nevada
 Eagle Valley (Oregon), Baker County
 Eagle Valley, Pennsylvania, Jefferson County
Valley Eagle, passenger train of Missouri Pacific Railroad (Houston-Brownsville-Mission, TX)